Floridaceras is an extinct genus of Rhinocerotidae (rhinoceros) of the Miocene epoch (early Hemingfordian), endemic to North America, living from around ~20.6–16.3 Ma, existing for approximately .

Taxonomy
Floridaceras was named by Wood (1964). Its type is Floridaceras whitei. It was assigned to Rhinocerotidae by Wood (1964) and Carroll (1988); and to Aceratheriinae by Prothero (1998).

Fossil distribution
The only site known is the Thomas Farm Site in Gilchrist County, Florida, ~20.6—16.3 Ma.

Description
Floridaceras was of unusually large size for a rhinoceros of the Hemingfordian. It would have been roughly comparable to a black rhinoceros in size, much larger than contemporaries such as the Menoceras. Like many primitive Aceratheriines, it has no horn, relatively long limbs and brachydont dentition (indicating it was a browser).

Sources

Miocene rhinoceroses
Miocene mammals of North America
Pliocene rhinoceroses
Fossil taxa described in 1964